Eshkanuiyeh-ye Olya (also Romanized as Eshkanū’īyeh-ye ‘Olyā; also known as Eshkanū’īyeh and Ishkanu) is a village in Hanza Rural District, Hanza District, Rabor County, Kerman Province, Iran. At the 2006 census, its population was 78, in 13 families.

References 

Populated places in Rabor County